In fluid dynamics, the mild-slope equation describes the combined effects of diffraction and refraction for water waves propagating over bathymetry and due to lateral boundaries—like breakwaters and coastlines. It is an approximate model, deriving its name from being originally developed for wave propagation over mild slopes of the sea floor. The mild-slope equation is often used in coastal engineering to compute the wave-field changes near harbours and coasts.

The mild-slope equation models the propagation and transformation of water waves, as they travel through waters of varying depth and interact with lateral boundaries such as cliffs, beaches, seawalls and breakwaters. As a result, it describes the variations in wave amplitude, or equivalently wave height. From the wave amplitude, the amplitude of the flow velocity oscillations underneath the water surface can also be computed. These quantities—wave amplitude and flow-velocity amplitude—may subsequently be used to determine the wave effects on coastal and offshore structures, ships and other floating objects, sediment transport and resulting bathymetric changes of the sea bed and coastline, mean flow fields and mass transfer of dissolved and floating materials. Most often, the mild-slope equation is solved by computer using methods from numerical analysis.

A first form of the mild-slope equation was developed by Eckart in 1952, and an improved version—the mild-slope equation in its classical formulation—has been derived independently by Juri Berkhoff in 1972. Thereafter, many modified and extended forms have been proposed, to include the effects of, for instance: wave–current interaction, wave nonlinearity, steeper sea-bed slopes, bed friction and wave breaking. Also parabolic approximations to the mild-slope equation are often used, in order to reduce the computational cost.

In case of a constant depth, the mild-slope equation reduces to the Helmholtz equation for wave diffraction.

Formulation for monochromatic wave motion 

where:
 is the complex-valued amplitude of the free-surface elevation 
 is the horizontal position;
 is the angular frequency of the monochromatic wave motion;
 is the imaginary unit;
 means taking the real part of the quantity between braces;
 is the horizontal gradient operator;
 is the divergence operator;
 is the wavenumber;
 is the phase speed of the waves and
 is the group speed of the waves.
The phase and group speed depend on the dispersion relation, and are derived from Airy wave theory as:

where
 is Earth's gravity and
 is the hyperbolic tangent.
For a given angular frequency , the wavenumber  has to be solved from the dispersion equation, which relates these two quantities to the water depth .

Transformation to an inhomogeneous Helmholtz equation 

Through the transformation

the mild slope equation can be cast in the form of an inhomogeneous Helmholtz equation:

where  is the Laplace operator.

Propagating waves 

In spatially coherent fields of propagating waves, it is useful to split the complex amplitude  in its amplitude and phase, both real valued:

where
 is the wave phase, which is the argument of 

where
  is the average wave-energy density per unit horizontal area (the sum of the kinetic and potential energy densities),
  is the effective wavenumber vector, with components 
  is the effective group velocity vector,
  is the fluid density, and
  is the acceleration by the Earth's gravity.

The last equation shows that wave energy is conserved in the mild-slope equation, and that the wave energy  is transported in the -direction normal to the wave crests (in this case of pure wave motion without mean currents). The effective group speed  is different from the group speed 

The first equation states that the effective wavenumber  is irrotational, a direct consequence of the fact it is the derivative of the wave phase , a scalar field. The second equation is the eikonal equation. Otherwise, κ2 can even become negative.

When  is used in the mild-slope equation, the result is, apart from a factor :

Now both the real part and the imaginary part of this equation have to be equal to zero:

The effective wavenumber vector  is defined as the gradient of the wave phase:
 and its vector length is 

Note that  is an irrotational field, since the curl of the gradient is zero:

 
Now the real and imaginary parts of the transformed mild-slope equation become, first multiplying the imaginary part by :

which—by noting that  in which the angular frequency  is a constant for time-harmonic motion—leads to the wave-energy conservation equation.

Derivation of the mild-slope equation 

The mild-slope equation can be derived by the use of several methods. Here, we will use a variational approach. The fluid is assumed to be inviscid and incompressible, and the flow is assumed to be irrotational. These assumptions are valid ones for surface gravity waves, since the effects of vorticity and viscosity are only significant in the Stokes boundary layers (for the oscillatory part of the flow). Because the flow is irrotational, the wave motion can be described using potential flow theory.

Luke's variational principle 

Luke's Lagrangian formulation gives a variational formulation for non-linear surface gravity waves.

where  is the horizontal Lagrangian density, given by:

Luke's Lagrangian formulation can also be recast into a Hamiltonian formulation in terms of the surface elevation and velocity potential at the free surface.

Linear wave theory 

The term  in the vertical integral is dropped since it has become dynamically uninteresting: it gives a zero contribution to the Euler–Lagrange equations, with the upper integration limit now fixed.

The waves propagate in the horizontal  plane, while the structure of the potential  is not wave-like in the vertical -direction. This suggests the use of the following assumption on the form of the potential 
 with normalisation  at the mean free-surface elevation 

Here  is the velocity potential at the mean free-surface level  Next, the mild-slope assumption is made, in that the vertical shape function  changes slowly in the -plane, and horizontal derivatives of  can be neglected in the flow velocity. So:

As a result:
 with 

The Euler–Lagrange equations for this Lagrangian density  are, with  representing either  or 

As a result, the evolution equations for the wave motion become:

with  the horizontal gradient operator:  where superscript  denotes the transpose.

The next step is to choose the shape function  and to determine  and

Vertical shape function from Airy wave theory 

Since the objective is the description of waves over mildly sloping beds, the shape function  is chosen according to Airy wave theory. This is the linear theory of waves propagating in constant depth  The form of the shape function is:

Here  a constant angular frequency, chosen in accordance with the characteristics of the wave field under study. Consequently, the integrals  and  become:

The following time-dependent equations give the evolution of the free-surface elevation  and free-surface potential 

From the two evolution equations, one of the variables  or  can be eliminated, to obtain the time-dependent form of the mild-slope equation:

and the corresponding equation for the free-surface potential is identical, with  replaced by  The time-dependent mild-slope equation can be used to model waves in a narrow band of frequencies around

Monochromatic waves 

Consider monochromatic waves with complex amplitude  and angular frequency :

Applicability and validity of the mild-slope equation 
The standard mild slope equation, without extra terms for bed slope and bed curvature, provides accurate results for the wave field over bed slopes ranging from 0 to about 1/3. However, some subtle aspects, like the amplitude of reflected waves, can be completely wrong, even for slopes going to zero. This mathematical curiosity has little practical importance in general since this reflection becomes vanishingly small for small bottom slopes.

Notes

References 

, 2 Parts, 967 pages.

, 740 pages.

Coastal geography
Equations of fluid dynamics
Water waves